Henry Smith (ca. 1560 – 1591?) was an English clergyman, widely regarded as "the most popular Puritan preacher of Elizabethan London." His sermons at St. Clement Danes drew enormous crowds, and earned him a reputation as "Silver Tongued" Smith. The collected editions of his sermons, and especially his tract, "God's Arrow Against Atheists," were among the most frequently reprinted religious writings of the Elizabethan age.

Life
Despite his popularity in the Elizabethan period, considerable uncertainty surrounds Smith's biography. Probably born in Leicestershire around 1560, Smith may have enrolled during the 1570s in colleges at both Cambridge and Oxford, but seems not to have taken a degree. He was, in any case, by 1589 among London's most popular preachers; however in that year, Smith seems to have contracted an illness which according to Charles Henry Cooper's Athenae Cantabrigienses caused him to devote his remaining time to preparing his writings for publication:

During his sickness, being desirous to do good by writing, he occupied himself in revising his sermons and other works for the press.  His collected sermons he dedicated to his kind patron Lord Burghley. . . He died before the collection came from the press, being buried at Husbands Bosworth in his native country.  In the register of that parish is this entry: Anno 1591, Henricus Smyth, theologus, m filius Erasmi Smyth, armigeri, sepult. fuit 4to. die Julii.

Smith's preparations allowed his writings to become among England's most popular, after his death. However, some sources indicate that Smith may have survived until around 1600, or even until as late as 1613.

See also
Erasmus Smith

References
R.B. Jenkins, Henry Smith: England's silver-tongued preacher (Macon, Ga.: Mercer University Press, 1983).
John W Jordan, "Colonial And Revolutionary Families Of Pennsylvania" (New York and Chicago, Genealogical Publishing Company, 1911).
William Richard Cutter, "Families of Western New York"

External links

Gary W. Jenkins, ‘Smith, Henry (c.1560–1591)’, Oxford Dictionary of National Biography, Oxford University Press, 2004. 

1560s births
1590s deaths
16th-century English Puritan ministers
Alumni of Queens' College, Cambridge